General Sir Charles John Stanley Gough,  (28 January 1832 – 6 September 1912) was a senior British Indian Army officer and a recipient of the Victoria Cross, the highest award for gallantry in the face of the enemy that can be awarded to British and Commonwealth forces.

Early life
Gough was born into a family of Anglo-Irish gentry in Chittagong, Bengal, British India on 28 January 1832.

Career
At age 16, Gough moved back to India, joined the 8th Bengal Cavalry, and served through the Second Anglo-Sikh War. By the age of 25, he was a major in the 5th Bengal European Cavalry.

During the Indian Mutiny, Gough and his brother Hugh were members of the Guides Corps, where they took part in the Siege of Lucknow and Gough was awarded the Victoria Cross (VC) for deeds which included saving his brother. The award was announced on 21 October 1859, and the citation read:

After the Mutiny, Gough continued to serve as a cavalry officer with the Indian Army, and took part in the Bhutan War of 1864–5.

On the outbreak of the Second Anglo-Afghan War in November 1878, Gough was appointed a brigade commander in the Peshawar Valley Field Force, which invaded Afghanistan via the Khyber Pass. In December 1879 he led a column to relieve the Siege of the Sherpur Cantonment, his advance precipitating an Afghan assault on the Sherpur garrison, which failed before his arrival. To mark his service during the war, Gough was made a Knight Commander of the Order of the Bath (KCB) in 1881.

Gough then held a number of senior posts, including command of the Hyderabad contingent from 1881 to 1885, and the Allahabad division from 1886 to 1890.

In April 1894 Gough achieved the rank of general, and in 1895 was made a Knight Grand Cross of the Order of the Bath (GCB), retiring to Ireland the same year.

He died on 6 September 1912 aged 80 in Clonmel, County Tipperary in Ireland.

Family
He was the son of Judge George Gough and Charlotte Margaret Becher; brother of General Sir Hugh Gough and great-nephew of Field Marshal The 1st Viscount Gough.

On 16 June 1870 he married Harriette Anastasia de la Poer. They had six children, of whom only two, the future General Sir Hubert de la Poer Gough and Brigadier General Sir John Edmond Gough, survived to adulthood.

Medals
His medals, including the VC, are on display in the Lord Ashcroft Gallery at the Imperial War Museum, London.

References

External links
Obituary in The Register, Adelaide, 9 September 1912
Location of grave and VC medal (County Tipperary, Ireland)
The Afghan War: Gough's Action at Futtehabad (1880) at Internet Archive

1832 births
1912 deaths
Military personnel of British India
Indian Rebellion of 1857 recipients of the Victoria Cross
British military personnel of the Second Anglo-Afghan War
Knights Grand Cross of the Order of the Bath
People from Chittagong
British East India Company Army officers
British Indian Army generals
British military personnel of the Bhutan War
British military personnel of the Second Anglo-Sikh War
Corps of Guides (India) officers
Irish recipients of the Victoria Cross